Susie the Little Blue Coupe is a 1952 animated short film produced by Walt Disney Productions and originally released by RKO Radio Pictures on June 6, 1952. The eight-minute film was directed by Clyde Geronimi and based on an original short-story by Bill Peet. The story was adapted for the screen by Peet and Don DaGradi.

Plot

Susie is a small blue coupe on display in a dealer showroom. She eventually is bought by a well-to-do man who is instantly smitten with her. Thrust into high society, she finds herself surrounded by much larger, faster and more luxurious cars, but eventually makes do. Her owner treats the car well but neglects to maintain her, and after years of wear and tear, the car stops running properly; the man, informed by his mechanic that Susie will need a massive overhaul, abandons her for a new vehicle. At a used car lot, Susie is purchased again, but the new owner, a cigar-smoking drunk who lives in a seedier part of town, does not treat the car with the same fondness as the first owner and leaves her on the curbside at night.

One night, the coupe is stolen, chased by the police and crashed; presumed "dead", she is sent to a junkyard. She shows stirrings of life, even in her wrecked state, and a young man notices and buys her at a bargain price. With the help of his friends, the young man completely restores and revives Susie as a brand new hot rod. An overjoyed and like-new Susie rides off.

Home media
The DVD release of The Love Bug featured this short as a special feature. The Adventures of Ichabod and Mr. Toad DVD also features the short as a bonus episode on the DVD's trivia section.

It also appeared on the It's A Small World of Fun Vol. 2 DVD.

Legacy
The film's method of anthropomorphizing the cars, using the windshield for the eyes and eyelids, served as a stylistic inspiration for the 2006 Disney-Pixar animated feature, Cars and its sequels and spin-offs.

While the animated film's copyright was not renewed, the music within it was. Effectively, this means that the film's images are public domain, but the short in full won't enter the public domain until 2048 under current United States copyright law.

See also
One Cab's Family a 1952 Metro Goldwyn Mayer cartoon short

References

External links
 
 Bill Peet, Jr.'s page about the film
 Pixar's blog referencing the influence on Cars
 Susie the Little Blue Coupe on Internet Archive

1950s Disney animated short films
1952 animated films
1952 short films
Animated films about automobiles
Films directed by Clyde Geronimi
Films produced by Walt Disney
Films scored by Paul Smith (film and television composer)
1950s English-language films
American animated short films
RKO Pictures short films
RKO Pictures animated short films